Arthur A. Cirilli (December 28, 1914December 17, 1995) was an American lawyer, politician, and judge in Wisconsin.  He was a judge in Douglas County for thirteen years, and was the first Chief Judge of the 10th Judicial Administrative District after its formation in the judicial reorganization of 1978.  Earlier in his career, he served six years in the Wisconsin State Senate as a Republican.

Biography

Arthur Cirilli was born in Eveleth, Minnesota, and raised in Iron County, Wisconsin.  He attended Hurley High School and Gogebic Junior College, in Ironwood, in the Upper Peninsula of Michigan.  He graduated from the University of Wisconsin in 1942, earning a Bachelor of Laws degree.

He served in the United States Army during World War II, and served in the Pacific theater.  After the war, he went to work as an attorney in Superior, Wisconsin.

He was elected to the Wisconsin State Senate in 1966 and re-elected in 1970.  In 1972, he was appointed a County Judge for Douglas County by Governor Patrick Lucey.  He was re-elected to that office in 1973, and, after the 1978 judicial reorganization, was transitioned to the Douglas County Circuit Court.  He reached mandatory retirement on July 31, 1985, but continued to serve as a reserve judge and arbitrator.

Judge Cirilli was active with the American Legion, the Veterans of Foreign Wars, the Fraternal Order of Eagles, the Benevolent and Protective Order of Elks, and the University of Wisconsin Board of Visitors.

He died in 1995 and was survived by his wife, Mary, and three adult children.

References

Republican Party Wisconsin state senators
Wisconsin lawyers
20th-century American politicians
People from Iron County, Wisconsin
People from Eveleth, Minnesota
University of Wisconsin–Superior alumni
20th-century American lawyers
United States Army personnel of World War II
1914 births
1995 deaths
Military personnel from Minnesota